Kalju Pitksaar (18 May 1931, Tallinn – 26 September 1995, Tallinn) was an Estonian chess player, who won the Estonian Chess Championship.

Biography
Pitksaar first participated in the Estonian Chess Championships in 1947, at the age of 16. In the Estonian Chess Championships, he has won gold (1957) and two silver (1951, 1958) medals.

In 1950, he was second in the traditional National Tournament in Pärnu. In 1952, Pitksaar won th Baltic Chess Championship. In 1952, in the Soviet Chess Championships quarterfinal in Krasnodar, he shared 2nd - 3rd place. In 1958, Pitksaar played for Estonia in the Soviet Team Chess Championship in Vilnius, where his team finished in fourth place.

In the same year, Pitksaar's chess career was suddenly interrupted - he was disqualified with formulation to "improve his behavior". For more than 20 years, he did not participate in a chess tournaments. In 1981, he returned and won the Tallinn Chess Championship. His last chess tournament was the Correspondence Chess Olympiad semifinal (1992-1996).

References

External links

 player profile at olimpbase.org (Soviet Team Chess Championship)

1931 births
1995 deaths
Sportspeople from Tallinn
Estonian chess players
Soviet chess players
20th-century chess players